Henry James, 1st Baron James of Hereford,  (30 October 1828 – 18 August 1911), known as Sir Henry James between 1873 and 1895, was an Anglo-Welsh lawyer and statesman. Initially a Liberal, he served under William Ewart Gladstone as Solicitor General in 1873 and as Attorney-General between 1873 and 1874 and 1880 and 1885. However, he broke with Gladstone over Irish Home Rule and joined the Liberal Unionists. From 1895 to 1902 he was Chancellor of the Duchy of Lancaster in the Unionist ministries of Lord Salisbury and Arthur Balfour.

Background and education
James was the son of Philip Turner James, a surgeon of Hereford, and Frances Gertrude, daughter of John Bodenham. His father's family was descended from the Gwynnes of Glanbran, Carmarthenshire, described in the nineteenth century as "one of the oldest in the Empire". His grandfather, Gwynne James, was also a surgeon, while his great-grandfather, another Gwynne James, was an apothecary. He was educated at Cheltenham College.

Legal and political career

James was admitted to the Middle Temple on 12 January 1849 and was called to the bar on 16 January 1852. He joined the Oxford circuit, where he soon established a notable reputation. In 1867 he was made postman of the Exchequer of pleas, and in 1869 took silk. At the 1868 general election he represented parliament for Taunton as a Liberal, unseating Edward William Cox after an election petition heard in March 1869. He held the seat until 1885, when he was returned for Bury. He attracted attention in parliament by his speeches in 1872 in the debates on the Judicature Act.

In September 1873 James was made Solicitor General by William Ewart Gladstone. Already in November 1873, he was promoted to Attorney General by Gladstone, a post he held until the government fell the following year. He received the customary knighthood at the time of his promotion. When Gladstone returned as prime minister in 1880 James resumed this office. He was responsible for introducing the Corrupt Practices Act 1883 and guiding it through parliament. In 1885 he was sworn of the Privy Council.

In 1886, he represented Sir Charles Dilke in the Crawford divorce case alongside Sir Charles Russell QC in which Dilke was accused of adultery with his brother's wife's sister. James and Russell, with disastrous consequences, advised Dilke not to go into the witness box saying there was insufficient evidence to convict him. The judge agreed, but decided Mrs Crawford's confession was sufficient to award her husband a divorce, resulting in an apparently contradictory verdict: that she had committed adultery with Dilke, but he had not with her! Their advice has been called "some of the worst professional advice that any man can ever have received". At a second hearing instigated by the Queen's Proctor, Dilke was cross-examined to devastating effect and his career ruined. 

On Gladstone's conversion to Irish Home Rule, James distanced himself from him and became one of the most influential of the Liberal Unionists. Gladstone had offered him the Lord Chancellorship in 1886, but he declined it and the knowledge of the sacrifice he had made in refusing to follow his old chief in his new departure lent great weight to his advocacy of the Unionist cause in the country. He was one of the leading counsel for The Times before the Parnell Commission, and from 1892 to 1895 was Attorney General to the Prince of Wales. In 1895 he raised to the peerage as Baron James of Hereford, in the County of Hereford. From 1895 to 1902 he was a member of Lord Salisbury's and Arthur Balfour's Unionist ministries as Chancellor of the Duchy of Lancaster. In later years he was a prominent opponent of the Tariff Reform movement, adhering to the section of Free Trade Unionists. On 11 August 1902, he was appointed to the Royal Victorian Order as a Knight Grand Cross (GCVO).

Personal life
Lord James of Hereford died unmarried in August 1911, aged 82. By his mistress Alice, whom he refused to marry, daughter of Robert Hardwicke (d.1874) of London, he left a daughter Alice Henland (1868–1936), who married Lt. Col. George Talbot Lake Denniss, Royal Wilts. Regt. The barony became extinct on his death. His portrait was painted by John St Helier Lander, collection of Middle Temple; his 1893 photo-portrait by Alexander Bassano is in the National Portrait Gallery. Lord James (Sir Henry James at the time) was also president of Bury Golf Club during the 1890s, during which time a championship trophy was awarded in his honour.

References

External links 

 
 

1828 births
1911 deaths
Liberal Unionist Party MPs for English constituencies
James, Henry
Barons in the Peerage of the United Kingdom
People educated at Cheltenham College
Members of the Privy Council of the United Kingdom
UK MPs 1868–1874
UK MPs 1874–1880
UK MPs 1880–1885
UK MPs 1885–1886
UK MPs 1886–1892
UK MPs 1892–1895
UK MPs who were granted peerages
Attorneys General for England and Wales
Solicitors General for England and Wales
Members of the Inner Temple
Knights Grand Cross of the Royal Victorian Order
Members of the Judicial Committee of the Privy Council
Peers of the United Kingdom created by Queen Victoria
Chancellors of the Duchy of Lancaster